Steven Michael Goodman (born August 3, 1957) is an American conservation biologist, and field biologist on staff in the Department of Zoology at the Field Museum of Natural History in Chicago.

Life
He graduated from the Interlochen Arts Academy High School in 1975. He graduated from the University of Michigan with a B.S. in 1984, from the University of Hamburg with a Ph.D. in 2000, and from the Université Paris-Sud XI, with an H.D.R. in 2005.
In the early 1990s, with the World Wildlife Fund, he created the Ecological Training Program (ETP).

Awards
2005 MacArthur Fellows Program 
Biodiversity Award

Works

Extinct Madagascar: Picturing the Island's Past. Steven M. Goodman, William L. Jungers, University of Chicago Press, 2014, 
The Natural History of Madagascar. Editors	Steven M. Goodman, Jonathan P. Benstead, University of Chicago Press, 2003, 
The Birds of Egypt. Edited by Steven M. Goodman & Peter L. Meininger, Oxford University Press, 1989,

References

1957 births
21st-century American biologists
University of Michigan alumni
University of Hamburg alumni
Paris-Sud University alumni
MacArthur Fellows
People associated with the Field Museum of Natural History
Living people